Hebeloma hiemale is a species of mushroom in the family Hymenogastraceae.

hiemale
Fungi of Europe
Taxa named by Giacomo Bresadola